In Poland, there are 6 powerline crossings of the Vistula river and one powerline crossing of the Odra river using pylons taller than 100 metres.

Ostrówek-Tursko Vistula Powerline Crossing 
Ostrówek-Tursko Vistula Powerline Crossing is a Vistula powerline crossing with a span-width of 880 metres on two 115-metre tall pylons, one situated

Lubanie-Bobrowniki Vistula Powerline Crossing 
Lubanie-Bobrowniki Vistula Powerline Crossing is a Vistula powerline crossing with a span-width of 960 metres on two 117-metre tall pylons, one situated
Lubanie-Bobrowniki Vistula Powerline Crossing, which is part of the powerline from Kozienice to Puławy, uses pylons for 6
conductors arranged on two crossbars and a separate crossbar for the two ground conductors.

Regów-Gołąb Vistula Powerline Crossing 
Regów-Gołąb Vistula Powerline Crossing, which is situated close to Lubaniew-Bobrowniki Vistula powerline crossing consists of two 108-metre tall pylons of the delta-type for a single 400 kV powerline circuit. It is a part of the powerline from Kozienice to Lublin and crosses the Vistula river with a span width of 960 metres. The pylons stand at  near Regów and at  near Gołąb.

Świerże Górne-Rybaków Vistula Powerline Crossing 
Świerże Górne-Rybaków Vistula Powerline Crossing is a powerline crossing of the Vistula river with a span width of 1,025 metres.

Nowodwory-Łomianki Vistula Powerline Crossing 
Nowodwory-Łomianki Vistula Powerline Crossing is a Vistula powerline crossing north of
Warsaw with a span width of 963 metres. It uses pylons with 3 crossbars for 6 circuits with a v-shaped top for the two ground conductors.
The latter is the tallest
electricity pylon in Poland.

Nowy Bógpomóż-Probostwo Dolne Vistula Powerline Crossing 
Nowy Bógpomóż-Probostwo Dolne Vistula Powerline Crossing, part of the 220 kV powerline running from Olsztyn to Wloclawek, is a powerline crossing of the Vistula river with a span width of 1,248 metres, which is probably the longest powerline span of Poland. Both pylons are delta pylons with a single crossbar carrying 3 conductors and 2 ground conductors.

Skolwin-Świnoujście Odra Powerline Crossing 
Skolwin-Inoujście Odra Powerline Crossing is a powerline crossing of the Odra river north of Szczecin. It has a span width of 664 meters.

See also 
 List of tallest structures in Poland

Towers in Poland
Powerline river crossings
Electric power infrastructure in Poland